The Lone Ranger is an American western drama television series that originally aired on the ABC network. The series starred Clayton Moore and Jay Silverheels as the Lone Ranger and Tonto, except for season three when John Hart played the role of The Lone Ranger.  The first 2 seasons aired for 78 consecutive weeks without a rerun, but some in between years were made up entirely of reruns. It premiered on September 15, 1949, and ended on June 6, 1957, with a total of 221 episodes over the course of 5 seasons.

Series overview

Episodes

Season 1 (1949–50)

Season 2 (1950–51)

Season 3 (1952–53)  
(John Hart takes over the role of the Lone Ranger.)

Season 4 (1954–55) 
(Clayton Moore returns as the Lone Ranger.)

Season 5 (1956–57) 
(This season was filmed in color.)

The Lone Ranger Rides Again

Availability 

In the United States the first 16 episodes from Season One are in the public domain.  "A Message from Abe" (episode 204, Season Five) is also in the public domain.

References

External links

Lists of American Western (genre) television series episodes